The Roger Rabbit shorts are a series of three animated short films produced by Walt Disney Feature Animation from 1989 to 1993. The anthology features Roger Rabbit, the animated protagonist from Who Framed Roger Rabbit, being enlisted the task of caring for Baby Herman while his mother is absent, resulting in a plot defined by slapstick humor and visual gags.  Each short concludes with a sequence involving live-action and animation, where the characters interact with live-action human beings, akin to the 1988 film.  Droopy Dog from MGM makes a cameo in all of the shorts.

Charles Fleischer, Kathleen Turner, Lou Hirsch, and April Winchell returned to reprise their voice roles from the film, alongside producers Steven Spielberg, Kathleen Kennedy, Frank Marshall, and Don Hahn. Marshall also directed the live-action segments in the first two shorts, while Industrial Light & Magic was responsible for the live-action visual effects. Produced in association with Spielberg's Amblin Entertainment, the three shorts (Tummy Trouble, Roller Coaster Rabbit and Trail Mix-Up) were originally attached to the theatrical releases of several Disney and Amblin films. A fourth short, Hare in My Soup, was cancelled during pre-production with three more (Clean and Oppressed, Beach Blanket Bay and Bronco Bustin' Bunny) in the planning stages also cancelled.

Tummy Trouble

Plot
Roger is placed in charge of watching Baby Herman when his mother needs to step out for an hour; as soon as she leaves, Herman breaks into a heavy crying fit which Roger doesn't seem to be able to break until he pulls out a bright shiny  rattle, which immediately garners Herman's attention. After a brief second of shaking it, Herman swallows the rattle, prompting Roger to scream and call 911 and to rush the baby to the emergency room. Roger is overcome with guilt when he visits, but quickly realizes Herman wants to drink from a milk bottle in the room; after Roger burps Herman, he hiccups the rattle, but finds, that in Roger's joyous celebration he accidentally swallows it, causing Baby Herman to become upset he lost his toy. Roger begins to dance, and has his hips rattling with the toy and giving Baby Herman some amusement, but is stunned when a doctor bursts in and mistakes Roger for Baby Herman and preps him for emergency surgery.

While Roger is gone, Herman spies Jessica Rabbit pushing a cart of milk bottles and gives chase, eventually following a runaway milk bottle into the emergency room where Roger is strapped to the table while the surgeons had disappeared for a lunch break. Herman mistakes a large surgical laser for a bottle and climbs up onto it, nearly dissecting Roger in the process. The laser detaches itself from the ceiling and flings a table of scalpels and hypodermic needles at Roger, who avoids them, but is electrocuted in the process. The laser flies around the room and lodges itself under Roger's stretcher and sends him and Herman both ejecting from the emergency room and causing Roger to gag up the rattle, and when Baby Herman to again swallow it before crashing into a wheelchair, they then fly down the hall and into an open elevator shaft due to wet floors causing the wheelchair they landed on to skid out of control. Baby Herman's diaper parachutes him safely to a floor while Roger ends up getting crushed by an elevator where Droopy is in while trying to catch Herman. Eventually they end up in a room with piles of gas pumps which are ignited and send them the pair launching miles into the air. As they fall, Herman coughs up the rattle, and causes Roger to swallow it again. As they crash back into the hospital, Roger crashes through several floors before landing smack down on the receptionist floor in the hospital. As he recovers, Baby Herman lands on Roger, causing him to cough up the rattle again, finally ending their adventure. But when Roger's celebration is short lived when he sees the bill for their rampant destruction and faints that he didn't win again, Herman then crawls over to the rattle and as the screen fades to black there is a gulping sound as he again swallows the rattle.

During the end credits, however, Herman spits the rattle out, and angrily threatens more trouble if he has to swallow the rattle again. After attempting to cool Baby Herman down, Roger is greeted by Jessica who seductively suggests they go home and play a little patty cake, in which a love stricken Roger coos as they walk off.

Cast
Charles Fleischer as Roger Rabbit
Kathleen Turner as Jessica Rabbit
Lou Hirsch as Adult Baby Herman
April Winchell as Mrs. Herman and Young Baby Herman
Richard Williams as Droopy
Corey Burton as the surgeons

Production
Tummy Trouble was produced over the course of nine months by a staff of 70 Disney animators.  It was the first animated short Disney had produced in 16 years to accompany the original release of a feature film, since Winnie the Pooh and Tigger Too in 1974.

The short was released with Walt Disney Pictures' Honey, I Shrunk the Kids, theatrically and on that film's initial video release. An adaptation of this short appeared in the graphic novel Roger Rabbit: The Resurrection of Doom.

Roller Coaster Rabbit

Plot
Roger Rabbit, Baby Herman and Mrs. Herman are at the local county fair. Mrs. Herman leaves to get her palm read by a fortune teller; she asks Roger to watch Baby Herman until she gets back. She also reminds him not to mess it up again. Roger reluctantly watches Baby Herman. Baby Herman loses his red balloon and bursts into tears when Roger goes to get him a new one. Before he returns, however, Baby Herman sees another red balloon at a dart game and goes to try to get it. When Roger comes back to give Baby Herman his balloon, he finds that he is gone, and sets off as the chase begins. First, Baby Herman finds himself following the balloon into a field occupied by a grazing bull. Roger soon follows the youngster and falls in bull dung. Baby Herman walks directly underneath the bull. He notices a round balloon-like object and grasps it; unknown to him, it is in fact the bull's scrotum. The grazing creature snaps. Roger picks up Baby Herman but just happens to be looking the bull in the eyes. The animal hurls Roger and Baby Herman into the air, sending them flying out of the field, and causing the two to land crashing into a roller coaster carriage which is traveling slowly up.

In the next stage of this short, the carriage continues to climb a tall hill in the track. The two reach the top of the drop which is exaggerated to reach beyond the clouds and into space. Roger looks down and sees the world. Moments later the carriage drops down thousands of meters. The speed of the drop is maintained throughout the remainder of the chase. After a few twist and turns (in the track) a shot of Jessica Rabbit appears, where she is tied down to the tracks, unable to move. She calls out to be saved before Roger and Baby Herman's carriage crushes her. As the cart draws near, it topples over and fortunately bounces over Jessica, avoiding her completely. The camera moves along and beside her appears Droopy for a quick one-liner. The story then continues. Roger grasps onto Baby Herman, tumbling and losing their carriage, leaving Roger sliding along the tracks with his feet, gradually gaining friction causing his feet to catch fire. The tracks run into a dark tunnel and then stumbles across a 'wrong way sign'. Finally Herman and Roger crash through the sign and into a real-life filming studio, a direct reference to the reality/cartoon crossover in the feature film when Roger ruins the film and refuses to go back to do the whole scene again. As the credits finish rolling, Baby Herman says that he cannot take anymore of Roger as a woman gives him a balloon and he pops it with his cigar.

Cast
Charles Fleischer as Roger Rabbit
Kathleen Turner as Jessica Rabbit
Lou Hirsch as Adult Baby Herman
April Winchell as Mrs. Herman and Young Baby Herman
Corey Burton as Droopy
Frank Welker as the Bull

Additional cast
Charlie Adler as the men's voiceovers (uncredited)

Production
Roller Coaster Rabbit (along with Trail Mix-Up) was produced at The Magic of Disney Animation located at Disney-MGM Studios in Lake Buena Vista, Florida. Rob Minkoff returned to direct the second short in the series.

Spielberg wanted the short to appear with Arachnophobia, Hollywood Pictures' first feature and a co-production between Disney and Amblin. However, CEO Michael Eisner opted to release the short with the US theatrical release of Touchstone Pictures' Dick Tracy, in hopes that the short would increase awareness to the film. Spielberg, who controlled a 50% ownership stake in the character, decided to cancel Hare in My Soup, the third short that had entered production.

Trail Mix-Up

Plot
The short features Roger Rabbit, Baby Herman and Mrs. Herman at the park setting up camp. Mrs. Herman plans to go hunting and leaves Roger in charge of watching Baby Herman. Trouble begins when Baby Herman wanders off into the dangers of the forest and Roger has to go and save him, leading to multiple calamities; such as Roger panicking at the sight of a caterpillar and spraying so much insecticide (named Mink-Off) that many trees die. Later, when Roger reads the nutrition on the box, Baby Herman follows a bee up to a beehive and goes to get some honey when Roger tries to save him. The beehive falls on Roger's head, causing him to get stung multiple times. The bees proceed to chase him, so Roger runs into a lake, where he panics at the sight of a shark's dorsal fin (which is actually controlled by Droopy Dog).

Later, Baby Herman follows a beaver (mistaking him for a dog), and is followed by Roger, who chases after them. Baby Herman follows the beaver up a pile of logs, and is chased by Roger, who follows, only to have the log that Baby Herman and the beaver are on taken to the sawmill. This ends up with Roger being shredded by a sawmill (that of which the result is 13 tiny Rogers, which then join again into a regular-sized Roger, who follows Baby Herman (still following the beaver) onto a conveyor belt with logs). It ends up with the logs being thrown down a log flume, eventually landing in a river. The log, Roger, Baby Herman, and the beaver are on, crashes into a bear, who also ends up on the log. Then the four fall off a waterfall. Roger's head gets stuck in a twig sticking out of the waterfall, and when he catches Baby Herman (holding on to the beaver), the bear grabs onto Roger's legs. The combined weight rebounds, sending all four flying, landing on a large boulder.

The boulder proceeds to roll down a hill, knocking over a tree trunk (with the same sound effects as a bowling pin), and then flying off a cliff. Eventually, Roger, the bear, the log, the beaver, the boulder, and Baby Herman all land on top of Old Predictable Geyser in that order. Then, Old Predictable Geyser erupts, sending Roger, Herman, the Bear, the Beaver, the boulder and the log flying out of the studio, passing the Hollywood sign. The group flies over half of the country all the way to Mount Rushmore and they end up crashing into the mountain, destroying all the carving of the presidents. Everyone is battered and beaten (except for Roger); as they walk away, Baby Herman yells at Roger for destroying a "national monument." Roger retorts that it's "not as if it's the end of the world," but then sticks a US flag (made of his clothes) in the ground which punctures the Earth, making it deflate and blow away like a balloon.

Cast
Charles Fleischer as Roger Rabbit
Kathleen Turner as Jessica Rabbit
Lou Hirsch as Adult Baby Herman
April Winchell as Mrs. Herman and Young Baby Herman
Corey Burton as Droopy
Frank Welker as the Bear and Beaver

Additional cast
Alice Playten as the Bee
John Kassir as Mount Rushmore

Production
Trail Mix-Up was directed by Barry Cook, instead of Rob Minkoff, who remained as a co-executive producer. Trail Mix-Up was the third and last Roger Rabbit short, and was again produced by Disney's Florida studio. Unlike the two previous shorts, the animation (still traditionally hand-drawn on paper) and composting was done digitally in the studio's CAPS system.

The short was released theatrically with Disney/Amblin's A Far Off Place on March 12, 1993.

Home media
In 1995, a VHS tape of the three shorts was released under the title It's Roger Rabbit, bundled with Who Framed Roger Rabbit. A nearly identical video was released by itself in 1996 under the title Disney and Steven Spielberg present The Best of Roger Rabbit. The three shorts are also included in the 2003 special edition "Vista Series" DVD of Who Framed Roger Rabbit. On March 12, 2013, Walt Disney Studios Home Entertainment remastered and reissued all three shorts as part of the 25th anniversary Blu-ray release of Who Framed Roger Rabbit.

Footnote
	
 Roller Coaster Rabbit was reissued under the Walt Disney Pictures label for the 2013 Blu-ray release of Who Framed Roger Rabbit.

References

External links
 
 
 

Film series introduced in 1989
1980s Disney animated short films
1990s Disney animated short films
American films with live action and animation
Animated films about rabbits and hares
Who Framed Roger Rabbit
Films set in Los Angeles
Films directed by Rob Minkoff
Droopy
Walt Disney Pictures animated films
Touchstone Pictures animated films
Amblin Entertainment animated short films
Animated short film series
Films directed by Barry Cook
1990s English-language films
1980s English-language films